The Confederación Sudamericana de Rugby (CONSUR) Championship C Division Championship took place between 2–8 December 2012 at Estadio de la Democracia in Guatemala City, Guatemala.  This was the first time CONSUR has run a 3rd division championship.

Guatemala hosted Costa Rica, Ecuador and El Salvador, with the tournament played over three games days.  The tournament was conducted as a single round robin tournament.

Due to visa and travel issues, only 8 players from the Ecuador team had arrived by the first game day.  As such, a game between Guatemala and a mix of the Ecuadorian players and local players was played as an exhibition game, which resulted in a 40-0 victory for the Guatemala national team.  The game was officially awarded to Guatemala as a walkover, by a score of 5-0.

Costa Rica were the champions of the tournament, beating Guatemala in the final round to win the championship.  Guatemala were runners up, with Ecuador finishing third, after a victory over El Salvador on the final day.

2012 CONSUR C Championship

Match Schedule

Related Page 
 2012 South American Rugby Championship "A"
 2012 South American Rugby Championship "B"

External links 
 Details

References 

2012
2012 rugby union tournaments for national teams
C
rugby union
rugby union
rugby union
rugby union
rugby union